The name Tess has been used for thirteen tropical cyclones in the northwest Pacific Ocean.

Typhoon Tess (1945)
Typhoon Tess (1953) (T5313) – struck Japan (ja)
Typhoon Tess (1958) (T5808)
Typhoon Tess (1961) (T6102, 05W)
Typhoon Tess (1964) (T6401, 01W, Asiang)
Typhoon Tess (1966) (T6613, 12W)
Typhoon Tess (1969) (T6904, 04W)
Typhoon Tess (1972) (T7209, 10W) – struck Japan
Typhoon Tess (1975) (T7508, 10W)
Tropical Storm Tess (1978) (T7828, 31W)
Tropical Storm Tess (1982) (T8206, 06W) – Joint Typhoon Warning Center analyzed Tess and Val (08W, Deling) as two different tropical storms, while Japan Meteorological Agency analyzed them as one tropical storm (T8206 Tess/Val)
Typhoon Tess (1985) (T8516, 15W, Miling)
Tropical Storm Tess (1988) (T8830, 25W, Welpring)

Pacific typhoon set index articles